Martin Matalon (born Buenos Aires in 1958) is an Argentine composer and musician, and recipient of the 2005 Grand Prix des Lycéens and 2001 Prix de L'Institut de France Académie des Beaux Arts. He was a student of music during his early life, attending both Boston Conservatory of Music and the Juilliard School of Music.

Compositions 
 Formas de Arena for Flute, Viola and Harp (2001)
 Traces II for Viola Solo and Live Electronics (2005)
 Trame VI for Viola and Chamber Orchestra (2003)

External links 
 Official Martín Matalon website
 
 

Argentine composers
1958 births
Living people
Musicians from Buenos Aires
20th-century Argentine male artists
21st-century Argentine male artists
20th-century composers
21st-century composers